Autobiography of Red (1998)  is a verse novel by Anne Carson, based loosely on the myth of Geryon and the Tenth Labor of Herakles, especially on surviving fragments of the lyric poet Stesichorus' poem Geryoneis.

Summary
Autobiography of Red is the story of a boy named Geryon who, at least in a metaphorical sense, is the Greek monster Geryon.  It is unclear how much of the mythological Geryon's connection to the story's Geryon is literal, and how much is metaphorical. Sexually abused by his older brother, his affectionate mother too weak-willed to protect him, the monstrous young boy finds solace in photography and in a romance with a young man named Herakles.  Herakles leaves his young lover at the peak of Geryon's infatuation; when Geryon comes across Herakles several years later on a trip to Argentina, Herakles' new lover Ancash forms the third point of a love triangle.  The novel ends, ambiguously, with Geryon, Ancash, and Herakles stopping outside a bakery near a volcano.

The book also contains Carson's very loose translation of the Geryoneis fragments, using many anachronisms and taking many liberties, and some discussion of both Stesichorus and the Geryon myth, including a fictional interview with "Stesichoros", a veiled reference to Gertrude Stein.

Style 

Critic Sam Anderson describes the book as follows:The book is subtitled "A Novel in Verse," but—as usual with Carson—neither "novel" nor "verse" quite seems to apply. It begins as if it were a critical study of the ancient Greek poet Stesichoros, with special emphasis on a few surviving fragments he wrote about a minor character from Greek mythology, Geryon, a winged red monster who lives on a red island herding red cattle. Geryon is most famous as a footnote in the life of Herakles, whose 10th labor was to sail to that island and steal those cattle—in the process of which, almost as an afterthought, he killed Geryon by shooting him in the head with an arrow.

Autobiography of Red purports to be Geryon's autobiography. Carson transposes Geryon's story, however, into the modern world, so that he is suddenly not just a monster but a moody, artsy, gay teenage boy navigating the difficulties of sex and love and identity. His chief tormentor is Herakles, a charismatic ne'er-do-well who ends up breaking Geryon's heart. The book is strange and sweet and funny, and the remoteness of the ancient myth crossed with the familiarity of the modern setting (hockey practice, buses, baby sitters) creates a particularly Carsonian effect: the paradox of distant closeness.

Reception
Autobiography of Red was warmly received by authors and critics, with highly positive reviews from Alice Munro, Michael Ondaatje, Susan Sontag, among others. The book also sold unusually well for literary poetry, with at least 25,000 copies sold by the year 2000, two years after its publication. It was described as "one of the crossover classics of contemporary poetry: poetry that can seduce even people who don't like poetry" and Carson herself as "that rarest of rare things, a bestselling poet."

The book was referenced, alongside Carson's previous work Eros the Bittersweet, in a 2004 episode of The L Word.

References

External links

New York Times Magazine on Anne Carson

1998 Canadian novels
1998 fantasy novels
Canadian fantasy novels
Verse novels
Novels with gay themes
Canadian romance novels
Alfred A. Knopf books
Classical mythology in popular culture
LGBT speculative fiction novels
Canadian LGBT novels
1990s LGBT novels
LGBT poetry
Bildungsromans
Novels set in Buenos Aires
Novels set in Peru
English-language novels
LGBT literature in Canada